Maksym Yakhno (born 3 April 1988) is a professional Ukrainian football midfielder who last time played for club FC Helios Kharkiv in the Ukrainian First League.

Yakhno is the product of the Metalist Kharkiv Youth School System. He made his debut for FC Metalist entering as a second-half substitute against FC Kharkiv on 26 May 2009 in Ukrainian Premier League.

He also played one match for Ukrainian national under-17 football team.

References

External links 

 

1988 births
Living people
Footballers from Kharkiv
Ukrainian footballers
FC Metalist Kharkiv players
FC Metalist-2 Kharkiv players
PFC Sumy players
FC Lviv players
FC Helios Kharkiv players
FC Solli Plyus Kharkiv players
FC Vovchansk players
Ukrainian Premier League players
Ukrainian First League players
Ukrainian Second League players
Ukrainian Amateur Football Championship players

Association football midfielders